Megantereon was a genus of prehistoric machairodontine saber-toothed cat that lived in North America, Eurasia, and Africa. It may have been the ancestor of Smilodon.

Taxonomy

Fossil fragments have been found in Africa, Eurasia and North America. The animal also ranged into southernmost China, as a mostly complete skull from Sabretooth Cave in Chongzuo indicates, though it seemed to have been rare in most of Asia because it was ill-adapted to closed forest environments. The oldest confirmed samples of Megantereon are known from the Pliocene of North America and are dated to about 4.5 million years. Samples from Africa are dated to about 3–3.5 million years (for example, in Kenya), samples from Asia to about 2.5 to 2 million years. In Europe, the oldest remains are known from Les Etouaries (France), a site which is now dated to less than 2.5 million years. A North American origin of Megantereon has therefore been suggested. However, recent fragmentary fossils found in Kenya and Chad, which date to about 5.7 and 7 million years, are probably from Megantereon. If these identifications are correct, they would represent the oldest Megantereon fossils in the world. The new findings therefore indicate an origin of Megantereon in the Late Miocene of Africa.

The true number of species may be less than the full list of described species reproduced below:
 Megantereon cultridens (Cuvier, 1824) (type species)
 Megantereon adroveri Pons Moya, 1987
 Megantereon ekidoit Werdelin & Lewis, 2000
 Megantereon falconeri Pomel, 1853
 Megantereon hesperus (Gazin, 1933)
 Megantereon microta Zhu et al., 2015
 Megantereon vakhshensis Sarapov, 1986
 Megantereon whitei Broom, 1937

In 2022, it was proposed, alongside a description of more material, that more Asian species than just M. falconeri: M. nihowanensis, M. inexpectatus (syn. M. lantianensis), and M. megantereon (syn. M. microta) existed. The authors disregarded M. falconeri, however, because of the poor record for that species, and also noted that two specimens – a skull in the Natural History Museum of London and a skull in a museum in Dublin – likely represented a new species (which had been previously noted by other authors).

Evolution
At the end of the Pliocene, the animal evolved into the larger Smilodon in North America, while it survived in the Old World until the middle Pleistocene. The youngest remains of Megantereon from east Africa are dated at about 1.5 million years. In southern Africa, the genus is recorded from Elandsfontein, a site with remains dated to around 700,000–400,000 years. Remains from Untermaßfeld show that Megantereon lived until 900,000 years ago in Europe. In Asia, it may have survived until 500,000 years ago, as it is recorded together with Homo erectus at the famous site of Zhoukoudian in China. The only full skeleton was found in Senéze, France.

Description

Megantereon was built like a large modern jaguar, but somewhat heavier. It had stocky forelimbs, the lower half of these forelimbs being lion-sized. It had large neck muscles designed to deliver a powerful shearing bite. The elongated upper canines were protected by flanges at the mandible. Medium-sized species of Megantereon are known from other parts of Eurasia and the Pliocene of North America. The smallest species from Africa and the lower Pleistocene of Europe have been estimated at only . However, these estimations were obtained from comparisons of the carnassial teeth.

Palaeobiology

In Europe, Megantereon may have preyed on larger artiodactyls, horses or the young of rhinos and elephants. Despite its size, Megantereon would have also likely been scansorial and therefore able to climb trees, like the earlier Promegantereon (thought to be its ancestor), but unlike the later Smilodon, which is believed to have spent its time on the ground. Megantereon also had relatively small carnassial teeth, indicating that once making a kill, it would have eaten its prey at a leisurely pace, either hidden deep in bushes or in a tree away from potential rivals. This indicates a similarity to modern leopards and their lifestyle in that it was probably solitary.

It is unlikely that Megantereon simply bit its prey since the long, sabre-teeth Smilodon is famed for are not strong enough to leave buried inside a struggling prey animal: the teeth would likely have broken off, and their tactic for killing therefore remains uncertain.

It is now generally thought that Megantereon, like other saber-toothed cats, used its long saber teeth to deliver a killing throat bite, severing most of the major nerves and blood vessels. While the teeth would still risk damage, the prey animal would be killed quickly enough that any struggling would be feeble at best.

In Dmanisi, Georgia, evidence also exists that Megantereon interacted with hominids from a Homo erectus skull. The skull, designated D2280, indicates wounds to the occipital matching the dimensions of the sabre-teeth of Megantereon. From the position of the bite marks, it can be inferred that the hominid was attacked from the front and top of the skull, and that the bite was likely placed by a cat which saw the hominid as a threat. Other machairodont bites have been found on rival predators, including other machairodonts, in past fossil discoveries, the wounds indicating aggressive behavior towards potential competition. The hominid likely managed to escape the Megantereon, as no evidence points to predation or scavenging, although the resulting wounds were fatal. Further evidence of Megantereon being a hunter of hominids exists as carbon isotope ratios in teeth at Swartkrans. When compared with its fellow machairodont, Dinofelis, which shared the same environment, it was discovered that Megantereon was more likely to prey on hominids than Dinofelis, which preferred to hunt grazing animals, based on carbon isotope ratios of its own teeth.

References

Further reading

 Augustí, Jordi. Mammoths, Sabertooths and Hominids: 65 Million Years of Mammalian Evolution in Europe. New York: Columbia University Press, 2002, .
 Mol, Dick, Wilrie van Logchem, Kees van Hooijdonk and Remie Bakker. The Saber-Toothed Cat of the North Sea. Uitgeverij DrukWare, Norg 2008, .
 Turner, Alan. The Big Cats and Their Fossil Relatives: An Illustrated Guide to their Evolution and Natural History. Illustrations by Mauricio Anton. New York: Columbia University Press, 1997, .

External links

Smilodontini
Pliocene carnivorans
Pleistocene carnivorans
Messinian genus first appearances
Pleistocene genus extinctions
Miocene mammals of Africa
Pliocene mammals of Asia
Pliocene mammals of Europe
Pliocene mammals of Africa
Pliocene mammals of North America
Pleistocene mammals of Asia
Pleistocene mammals of Europe
Pleistocene mammals of Africa
Pleistocene mammals of North America
Prehistoric carnivoran genera
Fossil taxa described in 1828